Q Cygni (Q Cyg), is a star located in the constellation Cygnus. It is also known as Nova Cygni 1876, and has the designation NGC 7114, and HR 8296. Nova Cygni is located in the northwestern portion of Cygnus along the border with Lacerta.

One of the earliest novae recorded, Q Cygni was discovered by astronomer Johann Friedrich Julius Schmidt on November 24, 1876. The star had undergone a nova, brightening to about 3rd magnitude and remaining as bright for four days.

The system is termed a cataclysmic variable, composed of a white dwarf in close orbit with another star that orbit each other every 10 hours. The white dwarf is surrounded by an accretion disc, which blazes much brighter than the star it circles. The system has been estimated to be 740 ± 11 parsecs distant. The secondary star has been estimated to be around 0.6 times as massive as the Sun, making it an orange dwarf of spectral type K5. Also known as a donor star, the secondary supplies mass to the white dwarf via its accretion disc.

A small nebulous disc was reported around the nova and this led to it being listed in the New General Catalogue as a possible planetary nebula. No nebulosity is visible in modern observations and the Revised New General Catalogue lists this as a "non-existent" object.

References

External links
Stars of Cygnus

Cygnus (constellation)
Novae
8296
J21414393+4250290
Durchmusterung objects
NGC objects
Cygni, Q